The women's 100 metres event  at the Friendship Games was held on 16 August 1984 at the Evžen Rošický Stadium in Prague, Czechoslovakia.

Medalists

Results

Heats
Wind:Heat 1: -0.3 m/s, Heat 2: +0.2 m/s, Heat 3: +0.6

"A" Final
Wind: -0.2 m/s

"B" Final
Wind: +0.5 m/s

See also
Athletics at the 1984 Summer Olympics – Women's 100 metres

References
 

Athletics at the Friendship Games
Friendship Games